Wallace Larry Haney (born November 19, 1942) is an American former Major League Baseball catcher. He played from 1966 to 1978 for the Baltimore Orioles, Seattle Pilots / Milwaukee Brewers, Oakland Athletics, and St. Louis Cardinals. Haney later served as bullpen coach with the Brewers. His son, Chris Haney, pitched in the majors, primarily for the Kansas City Royals. During a 13-year baseball career, he hit .215, with 12 home runs and 73 runs batted in.

Haney was valued by teams mainly for his defensive abilities. In addition to his .985 fielding percentage and skill at working with pitching staffs, he threw out 110 of 282 stolen base attempts (39.0%) and picked off nine baserunners during his career. He was acquired three separate times by the Oakland A's, and was on their roster during their entire World Championship year of 1974.

On July 27, 1966, Haney hit a home run in his first major league game (second at bat) against John O'Donoghue of the Cleveland Indians.
 
On September 6, 1968, Haney had his first and only four-hit game, when he hit three singles and a double against the Chicago White Sox. He also recorded five three-hit games in his career.

Haney played in two World Series games for the Oakland A's in 1974 against the Los Angeles Dodgers.

In his minor league career, he led California League catchers with 18 double plays and 38 passed balls while playing for the Stockton Ports in 1962, and led Eastern League catchers with 17 double plays while playing for the Elmira Pioneers in 1963.

After his major league career, Haney went to work for the Milwaukee Brewers organization. He was a major league coach in 1978–91, serving as bullpen coach from 1978 until 1989 and pitching coach in 1990 and 1991. He continued working for the Brewers in various capacities until .

Haney's Topps baseball cards for 1968 and 1969 are popular because the 1969 card is simply the reverse image of the 1968 card. He appears as a left-handed throwing catcher (with a mitt that fits on his right hand) in the 1969 card. The player/coach in the background (of both cards) is also reversed.

References

External links
, or Retrosheet

1942 births
Living people
American expatriate baseball players in Canada
Baltimore Orioles players
Baseball players from Virginia
Bluefield Orioles players
Buffalo Bisons (minor league) players
Elmira Pioneers players
Florida Instructional League Orioles players
Hawaii Islanders players
Iowa Oaks players
Major League Baseball bullpen coaches
Major League Baseball catchers
Milwaukee Brewers coaches
Milwaukee Brewers executives
Milwaukee Brewers players
Milwaukee Brewers scouts
Oakland Athletics players
Sportspeople from Charlottesville, Virginia
Rochester Red Wings players
Seattle Pilots players
St. Louis Cardinals players
Stockton Ports players
Tigres de Aragua players
American expatriate baseball players in Venezuela
Tucson Toros players
Winnipeg Whips players